Brass is a board game set in Lancashire, England during the Industrial Revolution. It was developed by Martin Wallace. The object is to build mines, cotton factories, ports, canals and rail links, and establish trade routes, all of which will be used to score points. The game is divided into two historical periods: the canal period and the rail period. Victory points are scored at the end of each. Depending on the card the players draw, they will be limited in their choices.

Details
Number of players 2-4 but it is best played with 4 players. Playing time 1-2 hours. It is suggested to be played by ages 14 and up.  Brass was followed by Age of Industry, which is basically a simplified (no canals), shorter (2 hours) and more accessible (minimum 2 players instead of 3) version of Brass.

Publisher
The game was published in 2007 by Warfrog (now Treefrog) Games, Wallace's publishing company. It was later published by Pegasus Spiele as Kohle - Mit Volldampf zum Reichtum ('coal') with additional artwork by Eckhard Freytag, and under its original name by Eagle Games and FRED Distribution (USA), White Goblin Games (France) and Wargames Club Publishing (China)

2018 reprint and successor 
In 2017 Canadian publisher Roxley Games launched a Kickstarter campaign to realize a reprinting of the game under the new name Brass: Lancashire with new artwork and components as well as slightly modified rules. At the same time the successor, Brass: Birmingham, was introduced, adding Gavan Brown and Matt Tolman to the design team and featuring new mechanisms while keeping the same core rule-set. The campaign succeeded reaching 1.7m CAD given only 80.000 CAD was pledged and both games hit retail in 2018.

Honours
2007 Jogo do Ano Winner
2007 Jogo do Ano Nominee
2007 Meeples' Choice Award
2008 Golden Geek Best Gamer's Board Game Nominee
2008 International Gamers Awards - General Strategy; Multi-player Nominee
2008 Tric Trac Nominee
2010 Nederlandse Spellenprijs Nominee

References

External links
 

Board games introduced in 2007
Martin Wallace (game designer) games